Living in Skin is the first album that Jason Harrod recorded as a solo artist.

Track listing
 "Siren Song" - 4:19
 "Waiting For My Day" - 5:37
 "When I Get Home" - 3:14
 "Ferry Man" - 3:22
 "Powder House Rag" - 2:56
 "Siobhan" - 4:37
 "Looming" - 3:57
 "Lifeline" - 4:50
 "Carolina" - 4:44

References

External sources
 Official Website

Jason Harrod albums
2000 albums